WWE Experience is a syndicated American television program that was produced by WWE which mainly recaps events taking place on Raw and SmackDown. The show ran from May 2004 until September 2005 in the US, broadcasting 64 episodes domestically before its cancellation. The show continues to run in international markets, with it being televised in Mexico as well as in Asian, European and in some African countries. The final episode of Experience aired in January 2020 internationally, and the show was cancelled.

History
The show was originally broadcast by Spike TV and was aired Sunday mornings at 10 A.M. The original hosts were Todd Grisham and Ivory, with the setting of the show being outdoors and usually around New York City. The PG-rated show was aimed at younger viewers and it summarized the events of Raw and Smackdown. The program marked the return of WWE programming to Sunday mornings since the cancellation of WWF Superstars of Wrestling in August  2001.

When WWE programming moved to the USA Network during September 2005, WWE Experience was cancelled in America to later be replaced with AM Raw, but the show continued to be produced for overseas audiences. The filming was moved to the WWE studios in Stamford, Connecticut following reports that Grisham hated to film in the rain. Ivory was released from WWE a few weeks before the cancellation of the show in the United States. In July 2006, Todd Grisham was replaced as host by Josh Mathews, and no clear reason for Grisham's replacement was confirmed despite Mathews reportedly saying, "No reason, Todd's gone, [Josh is] here, deal with it". After Josh Mathews became a commentator on ECW, he was replaced by Jack Korpela. In November 2011, following Korpela's departure from the WWE, he was replaced by Matt Striker. In late 2012, Striker welcomed Renee Young as co-host, and following Striker leaving the WWE in early 2013, Young remained as the sole presenter of the show until she was replaced by Kyle Edwards.  When Edwards was released in April 2016 he was replaced by Cathy Kelley who was temporarily joined by Corey Graves soon after.

Experience aired its final episode on the first weekend of January 2020. It was confirmed in a tweet by its host Scott Stanford that production would cease on the show, and no further episodes would air.

Hosts

Fill in guest hosts

International versions

Canada
There was also a different version of the show that aired on the Canadian sports network Sportsnet 360 (previously known as The Score). It mainly recapped Raw and SmackDown. Previously hosted by network personalities rather than WWE employees, the Canadian version was most recently hosted by Scott Stanford and Alyse Zwick, while past hosts have included Ryan Paton, Glenn Schiiler, Derek Snider, Greg Sansone, and Arda Ocal (who later hosted the American version of the show under the name Kyle Edwards). The program first aired on Sunday, October 8, 2006, and in January 2020 was replaced by This Week in WWE.

Puerto Rico
Puerto Rico hosts their own version of the show that airs Sundays at 1pm on free-to-air WAPA-TV, with the show being hosted by WWE's Spanish broadcaster Marcelo Rodriguez. The show is part of the WWE Weekend programing of the network that features the Spanish broadcast of SmackDown on Saturdays at 1pm and Experience on Sundays.

Malaysia
Malaysia had their own version of the show hosted by Zawen. It aired on Astro Ria, which is hosted by Malaysia's satellite provider, Astro Malaysia. The show began airing around the middle of December 2009, before being cancelled after 10 months on the air.

See also

List of current WWE programming

References

External links
 

Experience
2004 American television series debuts
2010s American television series
USA Network original programming
WWE Raw
WWE SmackDown
Spike (TV network) original programming
2020s American television series